The Middletown and Hummelstown Railroad  is a shortline railroad which operates freight and tourist passenger trains between Middletown to Hummelstown, Pennsylvania.

Passenger excursion trains
The Middletown and Hummelstown Railroad (M&H) uses both steam and diesel locomotives for passenger excursions. Coaches are 1920s-vintage Delaware, Lackawanna & Western High-Roof MU Trailers. Passengers board at the 1891-era freight station in Middletown for an  round-trip excursion along the Swatara Creek and Union Canal; a narrator relates history of the canal and various sites along the trip.

There is also a collection of heritage railway rolling stock displayed at Middletown Yard. A 1969 engine is used to transport freight trains. Freight service has been provided since 1976 and passenger excursion service has been provided since 1986.

U.S. Route 322 restriction
Though M&H owns all trackage between its two namesake towns, it only regularly operated as far north as Indian Echo Caverns until 2011. U.S. Route 322, a four-lane limited-access highway, lies between Indian Echo Caverns and the town of Hummelstown, where M&H connects with Norfolk Southern Railway's (NS) Harrisburg Line. PennDOT restricted M&H to just 12 crossings per year. However, M&H had requested additional crossing allowances and was willing to install additional crossing safety hardware.

Freight business is minimal on M&H, primarily due to the restricted access to NS in Hummelstown. M&H has stated that this restriction greatly hampers growing freight potential. PennDOT said it believes more discussion regarding warning devices for the crossing is needed given the volume and type of traffic on Route 322. In addition, the Hummelstown Borough Council has expressed "not in my backyard" concerns with having additional freight trains passing through town.

2011 flood damage
Historic flooding in September 2011 from Tropical Storm Lee damaged significant parts of the railway along Swatara Creek, including completely washing out one approach to the bridge crossing the creek. Repairs have been estimated to cost between $250,000 and $300,000, and thus the route stops short and no longer reaches Indian Echo Caverns or Hummelstown.

2014 transformer delivery
On Friday, January 24, a leased NS locomotive operated by M&H crew delivered a transformer, using line, to the PPL sub station on Fiddlers Elbow Road. Following extensive track repairs to the line, north of the 322 crossing over the summer, the transformer was delivered by NS Engine GP38-2 #5046. The transformer was brought in from the NS connection line, crossed U.S. Route 322 and then used the spur line to deliver the transformer to the sub station. It would be the first time since 1994 that a transformer was delivered to the substation via M&H.

Fleet

Locomotives

Trolleys

Coaches 
All but #9269 and #726 are used in tourist Passenger Service.

Cabins

Freight Cars

External links

Railroad's website

References

Pennsylvania railroads
Heritage railroads in Pennsylvania
Railway companies established in 1975
Spin-offs of the Reading Company
Defunct Pennsylvania railroads
Railway companies established in 1888
Railway companies disestablished in 1923
Predecessors of the Reading Company
Transportation in Dauphin County, Pennsylvania
Tourist attractions in Dauphin County, Pennsylvania